A presidium or praesidium is a council of executive officers in some political assemblies that collectively administers its business, either alongside an individual president or in place of one.

Communist states

In Communist states the presidium is the permanent committee of the legislative body, such as the Supreme Soviet in the USSR. The Presidium of the Supreme Soviet existed after 1936, when the Supreme Soviet of the USSR supplanted the Congress of Soviets of the USSR, as a replacement for the Central Executive Committee which was headed by "the Presidium of the Central Executive Committee". In its place was the Presidium of the Supreme Soviet alone, no Central Executive Committee, and from 1938 to 1989, the Chairman of the Presidium of the Supreme Soviet was the formal title of the head of state of the USSR until the office of Chairman of the Supreme Soviet was introduced in 1989, later to be replaced by the President of the Soviet Union in March 1990. The Republics of the Soviet Union were each led by Presidiums, such as the Presidium of the Supreme Soviet of the Russian Soviet Federative Socialist Republic and the Presidium of the Supreme Soviet of the Ukrainian Soviet Socialist Republic, whose chairmen were the de facto head of state in those republics.

From 1952 to 1966, the Politburo of the Communist Party of the Soviet Union was known as the Presidium of the Central Committee of the Communist Party, but despite the similarity in name with the Presidium of the Supreme Soviet, the two Presidia were very different in power and function.

The term presidium is currently used in the Democratic People's Republic of Korea (Presidium of the Supreme People's Assembly) and in the People's Republic of China (Presidium of the National People's Congress, Standing Committee of the National People's Congress; the Chinese word for presidium is  while standing committee is ). In the same way, the Workers' Party of Korea is led by the Presidium of the Politburo of the Workers' Party of Korea, made up of 5 members or fewer.

Other usage

Bangladesh
In the Bangladeshi political party Awami League, the Presidium is the innermost or topmost circle of members who are of highest importance within the party.

European countries
In Germany, the Presidium of the Bundestag consists of a president, who traditionally represents the largest party group, and at least one vice president from each party group. It is responsible for the legislature's routine administration, nowadays including its clerical and research activities. The Bundesrat of Germany is also led by a Presidium, of a President and 2 deputies. Earlier German states also had parliaments led by Presidiums; see Presidium of the Reichstag (German Empire), Presidium of the Reichstag (Weimar Republic), Presidium of the Reichstag (Nazi Germany) and Presidium of the Volkskammer in East Germany.

The Swedish  is also led by a Presidium of a Speaker and 3 deputies. The Hellenic Parliament in Greece is led by a Presidium composed of the Speaker, 7 deputies, 3 deans and 6 secretaries.

Non-state organisations
The Presidium of the Socialist International advises its president and prepares questions for consideration. In Flemish and Scandinavian student organisations, presidium is an umbrella term for all the chairmen in the organisations' administration.

See also
 Office of the President (disambiguation)

References

Types of organization
Politics of North Korea
Politics of China